The Night Ship is a 1925 American silent drama film directed by Henry McCarty and starring Mary Carr, Tom Santschi and Robert Gordon.

Synopsis
After sailor Bob Randall returns home to Maine after six years being marooned in the South Seas, he discovers that his sweetheart has married the villanous Captain Jed Hobbs. He vows his revenge and manages to discover that Hobbs is gun running to Central America.

Cast
 Mary Carr as Martha Randall
 Tom Santschi as Captain Jed Hobbs
 Robert Gordon as Bob Randall
 Margaret Fielding as Elizabeth Hobbs
 Charles Sellon as Jimson Weed 
 Willis Marks as David Brooks
 Charles W. Mack as Eli Stubbs
 Mary McLain as Jamet Hobbs 
 L.J. O'Connor as Cassidy
 Julian Rivero as 	Pedro Lopez

References

Bibliography
 Connelly, Robert B. The Silents: Silent Feature Films, 1910-36, Volume 40, Issue 2. December Press, 1998.
 Munden, Kenneth White. The American Film Institute Catalog of Motion Pictures Produced in the United States, Part 1. University of California Press, 1997.

External links
 

1925 films
1925 drama films
1920s English-language films
American silent feature films
Silent American drama films
Films directed by Henry McCarty
American black-and-white films
Gotham Pictures films
Seafaring films
Films set in Maine
1920s American films
Silent adventure films